Nashrul Amin (born 17 June 1997) is a Singaporean footballer who plays as a Winger for Tanjong Pagar United FC in the Singapore Premier League.

Career statistics

Club

Notes

References

Living people
1997 births
Singaporean footballers
Association football midfielders
Tanjong Pagar United FC players
Singapore Premier League players